Pavurallakonda or Pavurallabodu is the local name of a hill, popularly known as Narasimhaswamy Konda, near Bheemunipatnam about 25 km towards north of Visakhapatnam, in the Indian state of Andhra Pradesh. It is located at a height of about 150 meters above mean sea level.

Pavurallakonda consists of a ruined hill-top Buddhist monastic complex probably witnessed human habitation from 3rd century BCE to 2nd century CE. It is one of the largest Buddhist monasteries of North Coastal Andhra Region. Hinayana Buddhism may have flourished at this hill-top site.

Initial Excavation of this site yielded many relics. Two Brahmi label inscriptions, foundations of Viharas, circular chaityas, votive stupas, halls etc. are located among the ruins. Coins, polished ware, beads etc. were recovered from the site by the state archaeology Department of Andhra Pradesh. Nearly Sixteen rock-cut cisterns are carved on the hill for the storage of rain water. Excavations and Restoration Program are under progress at Pavurallakonda.

The Gosthani River flows close by this site. This site is contemporary with the nearby Buddhist sites in Visakhapatnam district like Bavikonda and Thotlakonda.

The Indian National Trust for Arts and Cultural Heritage (INTACH) has already appealed to the authorities to ensure better protection of Buddhist sites by taking up the declaration of Bavikonda, Thotlakonda, Pavurallakonda  and Bojjannakonda as heritage sites by UNESCO. This will not only pave the way for steady flow of funds but also generate employment opportunities for the locals.

Origin of the name

Pavurallakonda in general gives the meaning as 'The Hill of the Pigeons' (pavuralu in Telugu means pigeons and konda means hill).But as per some studies conducted at this site it may be known as Pavurallakonda due to the availability of white stone on the hillock (pavurallu means white stones locally). The origin of the name of this site needs clarification yet.

Gallery

References

Buildings and structures in Visakhapatnam
Archaeological sites in Andhra Pradesh
Stupas in India
Buddhist sites in Andhra Pradesh
Buddhist caves in India
Buddhist monasteries in India
Tourist attractions in Visakhapatnam
Indian rock-cut architecture
Former populated places in India
Buddhist pilgrimage sites in India
Caves containing pictograms in India
Caves of Andhra Pradesh
Geography of Visakhapatnam